John Malcolm (26 March 1936 – 13 June 2008) was a Scottish actor who appeared in numerous films and television productions over a 40-year period.
 
He attended Barnsley Holgate Grammar School for Boys, Barnsley and trained as an actor at RADA. He then appeared in repertory theatre in Scotland and England and with the Royal Shakespeare Company. He also founded the Traverse Theatre, Edinburgh in 1962 and The Theatre Chipping Norton in 1973.

His film appearances included The Reckoning (1969), The House That Dripped Blood (1971), The Ragman's Daughter (1972), Coming Out of the Ice (1982), and The Dirty Dozen: Next Mission (1985). His television appearances included Enemy at the Door as Oberleutnant Kluge, Nanny, Coronation Street, and the 1988 miniseries War and Remembrance as Field Marshal Wilhelm Keitel.

References

External links

1936 births
2008 deaths
People educated at Holgate School, Barnsley
Scottish male film actors
Scottish male stage actors
Scottish male television actors
People from Stirling